Sir Robert Corbet, 4th Baronet (c.1670 – 3 October 1740), of Stoke, Shropshire, was an English Whig politician who sat in the English and British House of Commons between 1705 and 1722, and was an official in the Royal Household.

Corbet was the only surviving son of Sir John Corbet, 3rd Baronet  of Stoke upon Tern, Shropshire. He matriculated at Christ Church, Oxford on 6 July 1687, aged 17 and was admitted to the Inner Temple in 1688. He succeeded to the baronetcy in 1695.

Corbet was appointed High Sheriff of Shropshire for 1700–01 and was then elected to Parliament at the 1705 English general election to represent the county of Shropshire until 1710. He was reelected for Shropshire again in 1715, sitting until 1722. He was a loyal Whig and was rewarded for his party loyalty with the position of Clerk of the Green Cloth in the Royal household, a position he held, progressing from Third Clerk to First Clerk, until 1735.

In that year he gave up the position in the Royal household to make way for a current Member of Parliament and was made instead a Commissioner of Customs until his death.

Corbet died in 1740. He had married Jane, the daughter of William Hooker, with whom he had 3 sons and 3 daughters. The baronetcy passed to his eldest son Sir William Corbet, 5th Baronet.

References

1740 deaths
Politicians from Shropshire
Alumni of Christ Church, Oxford
Members of the Inner Temple
Baronets in the Baronetage of England
High Sheriffs of Shropshire
English MPs 1705–1707
Members of the Parliament of Great Britain for English constituencies
British MPs 1707–1708
British MPs 1708–1710
British MPs 1715–1722
Year of birth uncertain